Hexanitratoaluminate is an anion of aluminium and six nitrate groups with formula [Al(NO3)6]3− that can form salts called hexanitratoaluminates.

Related compounds
Hexaperchloratoaluminate [Al(ClO4)6]3− has perchlorate groups instead of nitrate, and is similarly sensitive to water. Pentanitratoaluminates have five nitrate groups. Tetranitratoaluminates have only four nitrate groups.

Examples
A known salt is potassium hexanitratoaluminate K3[Al(NO3)6].

Tetramethylammonium hexanitratoaluminate can be formed from tetramethylammonium chloride, aluminium chloride and dinitrogen tetroxide diluted with nitromethane.

Rubidium hexanitratoaluminate also exists.

References

Aluminium complexes
Nitrates
Anions